Florent Stéphane Sinama Pongolle (born 20 October 1984) is a French former professional footballer who played as a forward.

He was signed at only 16 by Liverpool, but could never impose himself in the first team. He also spent several seasons in Spain, with Recreativo, Atlético Madrid and Zaragoza.

Pongolle is now a pundit with Canal + in France.

Early life
Sinama Pongolle was born in Saint-Pierre, Réunion.

Club career

Liverpool
Sinama Pongolle began his career at hometown club Saint-Pierroise before moving to Le Havre in Metropolitan France at the age of 11. In 2001 he, along with his cousin Anthony Le Tallec, was signed by Liverpool, after some impressive performances in both the UEFA European Under-16 Championship and the FIFA Under-17 World Championship. He was named player of the tournament as France won the latter competition, and remained at Le Havre – as Le Tallec – for a further two years on loan.

After his return, Sinama Pongolle appeared sporadically for the Reds, with some highlights however: in the team's victorious campaign in the UEFA Champions League, he came from the bench against Olympiacos and immediately scored Liverpool's equaliser to make it 1–1, in an eventual 3–1 win and qualification to the round of 16; he was, however, left out of the squad for the final.

Sinama Pongolle also netted in the third round of the 2005–06 FA Cup against Luton Town, as he helped Liverpool come from 3–1 down to a final score of 5–3, with the side finally emerging victorious in the tournament, and scoring in the 2005–06 Champions League 2–1 away defeat of Real Betis, with a chip from 20 yards.

In late January 2006, Sinama Pongolle was loaned to fellow Premier League side Blackburn Rovers until the end of the season. He scored once for them, a 2–3 defeat at Tottenham Hotspur.

Spain
On 30 August 2006, Sinama Pongolle signed a one-year contract at Recreativo de Huelva, with an option to sign on for a further two years. On 4 May 2007, the Andalusians confirmed he had agreed to a deal until 2011, for a fee of €4 million. He was Recre's top goalscorer in his two La Liga seasons with the team, at 12 and ten respectively.

Sinama Pongolle joined Atlético Madrid on 3 July 2008, for a fee believed to be in the region of £8 million. Initially thought of as a backup to Diego Forlán and Sergio Agüero, he benefitted from an injury to the Uruguayan, scoring four goals in his first five league appearances for the Colchoneros, with braces against former club Recreativo and Getafe; later in his debut campaign, injury and match bans to Maxi Rodríguez saw him playing several games as right winger, as the team once again finished fourth.

Sporting CP and Rostov

In the winter transfer market opening in 2010, Sinama Pongolle was transferred to Sporting CP for €6.5 million, with the fee possibly raising to €7.5. On 26 March 2010, he scored his first goal for the Lions, but also conceded an own goal in a 3–2 loss at C.S. Marítimo.

Sinama Pongolle spent the following two seasons on loan, with Zaragoza and Saint-Étienne, the latter in his homeland. On 30 August 2012 he terminated his contract with Sporting, going on to spend two years in the Russian Premier League with FC Rostov where he featured rarely.

Later years
On 9 September 2014, Sinama Pongolle signed with Major League Soccer's Chicago Fire. In November of the following year, after a short spell in Switzerland with Lausanne-Sport, he joined Dundee United.

In July 2016, Sinama Pongolle joined Chainat Hornbill of the Thai League 1, scoring once in his debut but in a 2–7 away defeat against Chonburi FC. In early November, in spite of the team's relegation, the 32-year-old extended his contract until 2018.

Sinama Pongolle returned to the island of his birth in January 2019, rejoining Saint-Pierroise with Uruguayan strike partner Diego Silva also making the same move from Thailand. Though he retired partway through the campaign, he contributed to them becoming the first Outre-Mer club since 1989 to reach the last 32 of the Coupe de France, scoring a hat-trick in the fourth round 9–1 win over ES Étang-Salé.

International career
After his under-16 and under-17 exploits, Sinama Pongolle made his France under-21 debut on 21 August 2002. He was a part of the squad that participated in the 2006 UEFA European Championship which took place in Portugal and, at the end of his four-year tenure with this category, ranked first in caps (37) and goals (11).

Sinama Pongolle played his only game with the senior side on 14 October 2008, during a 3–1 friendly win against Tunisia.

Career statistics

Club

International

Honours
Liverpool
FA Community Shield: 2006
UEFA Super Cup: 2005
FIFA Club World Championship runner-up: 2005

Rostov
Russian Cup: 2013–14

Chainat Hornbill
Thai League 2: 2017France U17FIFA U-17 World Championship: 2001Individual'''
FIFA U-17 World Championship Golden Ball: 2001
FIFA U-17 World Championship Golden Shoe: 2001

References

External links

Liverpool historic profile

1984 births
Living people
Footballers from Réunion
French footballers
France youth international footballers
France under-21 international footballers
France international footballers
Association football forwards
Ligue 1 players
Ligue 2 players
JS Saint-Pierroise players
Le Havre AC players
AS Saint-Étienne players
Premier League players
Liverpool F.C. players
Blackburn Rovers F.C. players
La Liga players
Recreativo de Huelva players
Atlético Madrid footballers
Real Zaragoza players
Primeira Liga players
Sporting CP footballers
Russian Premier League players
FC Rostov players
Major League Soccer players
Chicago Fire FC players
FC Lausanne-Sport players
Scottish Professional Football League players
Dundee United F.C. players
Florent Sinama Pongolle
Florent Sinama Pongolle
Florent Sinama Pongolle
French expatriate footballers
Expatriate footballers in England
Expatriate footballers in Spain
Expatriate footballers in Portugal
Expatriate footballers in Russia
Expatriate soccer players in the United States
Expatriate footballers in Switzerland
Expatriate footballers in Scotland
Expatriate footballers in Thailand
French expatriate sportspeople in England
French expatriate sportspeople in Spain
French expatriate sportspeople in Portugal
French expatriate sportspeople in Russia
French expatriate sportspeople in the United States
French expatriate sportspeople in Scotland
French expatriate sportspeople in Thailand
Black French sportspeople